The 13th Selangor state election was held on 5 May 2013.
The Selangor State Legislative Assembly would automatically dissolve on 22 April 2013, the fifth anniversary of the first sitting, and elections must be held within sixty days (two months) of the dissolution; on or before 22 June 2013, with the date to be decided by the Election Commission of Malaysia, unless dissolved prior to that date by the Head of State, Sultan of Selangor on the advice of the Head of Government, Menteri Besar of Selangor.

The incumbent unofficial coalition Pakatan Rakyat won a supermajority of 44 seats and was able to form a government, securing a second term while the opposition Barisan Nasional won 12 seats.

Background
The state election is the 13th state election in Selangor since the independence of Malaya (now Malaysia) in 1957. The governing Pakatan Rakyat (PR) will seek to secure their second consecutive term in office since 2008.
According to the Laws of the Constitution of Selangor 1959, the maximum term of the Selangor State Legislative Assembly, the legislature of Selangor, is five years from the date of the first sitting of Assembly following a state election, after which it is dissolved by operation of law. The Assembly would have been automatically dissolved on 22 April 2013, the fifth anniversary of its first sitting on 22 April 2008.

Electoral system
Each state constituencies of Selangor will elect one member to the Selangor State Legislative Assembly using the first-past-the-post voting system. If one party obtains a majority of seats, then that party is entitled to form the State Government, with its leader as Menteri Besar. If the election results in no single party having a majority, there is a hung assembly, of which will be dissolved under the royal prerogative of the Sultan.

Voting Eligibility

To vote in the state election, one had to be:
 registered in the electoral roll as an elector in the constituency in which he resides on;
 aged 21 or over on the registration date;
 a resident of the constituency, or if not so, an absentee voter;
 not disqualified under any law relating to offences committed in connection with elections.

Results

References

Selangor state elections
2013 elections in Malaysia